.bg is the country code top-level domain (ccTLD) in the Domain Name System of the Internet for Bulgaria. It is currently operated by Register.BG.

.bg domains can be registered by European Union citizens, companies or foreign companies that have registered branches or commercial representatives in Bulgaria. The price of domain registration is €30 per year (€36 including VAT). 

Until mid-2006, the price was a one-time registration fee of US$50 plus US$50 per year (total of US$120 including VAT for the first year). For local standards this was a very high price, and many Bulgarian sites were registered under .com (esp -bg.com), .org, or .net domains, as the registration costs were significantly lower (US$8–12 per year) and less of a bureaucratic hassle.

From August 25, 2008, Register.BG simplified the procedures, allowing the registration of domain names in the .bg zone without providing documented grounds (trademarks, company names) for the name. Eventual disputes are to be solved via the newly established Arbitration committee.

Since September 18, 2006, Register.bg proposes new, third-level domains in the a.bg, b.bg, etc., subdomains (a Latin letter or a digit +.bg), lower cost (€12/year incl. VAT), with less restrictions and no dispute resolution. They are targeted mainly at private individuals.

The domain has been enabled with Domain Name System Security Extensions (DNSSEC) since October 2007.

On September 5, 2009, Register.bg started accepting second- and third-level domain names in Cyrillic with letters found in the Bulgarian language only.

See also 
.бг

References

External links 
 IANA .bg whois information
 Register.bg
 Whois service

Country code top-level domains
Internet in Bulgaria
Council of European National Top Level Domain Registries members
Mass media in Bulgaria
Computer-related introductions in 1995